This is a list of mayors of Sherbrooke, Quebec. 

 1852-1853 : George Frederick Bowen
 1854-1855 : Joseph Gibb Robertson
 1855-1857 : Albert Philips Ball
 1858-1868 : Joseph Gibb Robertson
 1868-1869 : Richard William Heneker
 1869-1872 : Joseph Gibb Robertson
 1873-1875 : Richard Dalby Morkill
 1875-1876 : John Griffith
 1876-1877 : Eleazar Clark
 1877 : Richard William Heneker
 1877-1878 : Eleazar Clark
 1878-1879 : William Bullock Ives
 1880-1881 : Hubert-Charon Cabana
 1881-1882 : John Griffith
 1882-1883 : James William Wigget
 1883-1885 : Alexander Galt Lomas
 1885 : Hubert-Charon Cabana
 1885-1887 : William Thomas White
 1887-1888 : William Murray
 1888-1889 : Louis-Edmond Panneton
 1889-1890 : George Gilman Bryant
 1890-1891 : Jérome-Adolphe Chicoyne
 1891-1892 : Israël Wood
 1893-1894 : Daniel McManamy
 1894-1895 : Gordon Clark
 1895-1896 : Louis-Charles Bélanger
 1897-1898 : Harry Redfern Fraser
 1898 : Stanilas Fortier
 1899 : Harry Redfern Fraser
 1900 : Louis-Charles Bélanger
 1901 : Arthur Norreys Worthington
 1902 : Judes-Olivier Camirand
 1903 : William Farwell
 1904 : Judes-Olivier Camirand
 1905 : John Leonard
 1906 : Charles-Frédéric Olivier
 1907 : William Farwell
 1908-1909 : Léonilde-Charles Bachand
 1910-1911 : Charles-Walter Cate
 1912-1913 : Félix-Herménégilde Hébert
 1914-1915 : James MacKinnon
 1916-1918 : Ernest Sylvestre
 1918-1920 : Charles Dickinson White
 1920-1922 : Donat Oscar Edouard Denault
 1922-1924 : William Morris
 1924-1926 : William Brault
 1926-1928 : James Keith Edwards
 1928-1930 : Joseph-Sylvini Tétreault
 1930-1932 : Albert Carlos Skinner
 1932-1934 : Ludger Forest
 1934-1936 : Frédérick Hamilton Bradley
 1936-1938 : Émile Rioux
 1938-1940 : Marcus Trenholm Armitage
 1940-1942 : Joseph Labrecque
 1942-1944 : Alexander Clark Ross
 1944-1946 : Joseph-Wencelas Genest
 1946-1948 : James Guy Dixon Bryant
 1948-1950 : Alphonse Trudeau
 1950-1952 : Charles Benjamin Howard
 1952-1955 : J. Émile Levesque
 1955-1970 : Armand Nadeau
 1970-1974 : Marc Bureau
 1974-1982 : Jacques O'Bready
 1982-1990 : Jean-Paul Pelletier
 1990-1994 : Paul Gervais
 1994-2009 : Jean Perrault
 2009-2017 : Bernard Sévigny
 2017-2021 : Steve Lussier
 2021-Present : Évelyne Beaudin

References

 
Sherbrooke